Qawmi Madrasah is an adjective describing one of the two major madrasah educational categories in Bangladesh. The Qawmi madrasahs are not regulated by the Bangladesh Madrasah Education Board. As private charitable organizations, Qawmi madrasahs are supported almost exclusively by donation.

The theological curriculum of the Qawmi madrasahs predominantly follow the Islamic Deobandi model. In the past, the degrees they conferred lacked accreditation or official recognition, unlike those conferred by official Alia madrasahs (also spelled "Aliya" and "Aliah"), which follow the Calcutta Alia tradition. Starting in 2006, two years after the founding of the privately run Befaqul Mudarressin education board for Qawmi madrasahs, the Bangladeshi government began to recognize some Qawmi degrees.

As of 2006, there were approximately 15,000 registered Qawmi madrasahs in Bangladesh, with 200,000 teachers educating 4 million students. Actual figures are unknown and Qawmi madrasas do not keep enrollment records. Moreover, it has been argued that if unregistered Qawmi madrasahs were counted then it could put the total number of Bangladeshi madrasahs as high as 64,000—suggesting that Qawmi madrasahs outnumber their official Alia counterparts (of which 25,201 existed in 2004).

History

Qawmi educational practices originate from the traditional Muslim educational system of Bangladesh. During the British colonial period, these types of madrasahs were called "Khariji," or outside of government. Later, the term "Qawmi" emerged from the word "qom" (meaning "the public")—stemming from the fact that Qawmi madrasahs reject state funding and instead rely on donations from the public.

After 1971, some Qawmi madrasahs began to modernize their teaching, such as by switching the language of instruction from Urdu to Bengali and adding some English language and mathematics lessons. In 1978, a government body called the "Non-government Education Board" was established in an attempt to co-ordinate these madrasahs, of which 2,043 registered with that board by 1998.

The later part of the 20th century saw a major largely unregulated growth in the whole madrasah sector, which expanded from roughly 4,100 schools in 1986 to potentially as many as 64,000 schools by 2005.

The Befaqul Mudarressin of Bangladesh Qawmi Madrasah Education Board was formed in 2004. Soon afterwards, from August 2006, the Bangladeshi government began recognizing and supporting the Qawmi system through recognizing the 'Dawra degree' of the Qaumi madrasas as equivalent to master's degree in Islamic Studies or Arabic literature. By this time, approximately 15,000 madrasahs had registered with the Befaqul Mudarressin. In April 2017, Prime Minister Sheikh Hasina reiterated her commitment to the earlier recognition of certificates of Dawrae Hadith under Qawmi Madrasa Education Boards as equivalent to master's degree in Islamic Studies and Arabic.

Qawmi education systems
There are two major Qawmi educational systems: those that use the old Dars-i-Nizami curriculum and those that have a modified Nizami curriculum (such as by including the English language and the subject of mathematics).

The Dars-i-Nizami system originated from early eighteenth century India. There is some controversy regarding movements to "reform" the system, with some calling the move "an 'anti-Islamic' conspiracy, alleging that these are a means to secularise madrasas and rob them of their Islamic identity"—though reformers generally contest that they do not want secularization and that they are not a conspiracy.

In general, Qawmi primary education lasts six years, though it does not differentiate students by progressive grade levels. While the Qawmi primary level covers all subjects found in other madrasah systems, there is no specific time-sequence or order by which subjects are taught, as would be expected in grade-based systems. Thus, imposing class-graduated terminology on the Qawmi system may not be meaningful.

Befaqul Mudarressin of Bangladesh Qawmi Madrasah Education Board
In 2004, many Qawmi madrasahs began organizing together under an umbrella organization called the Befaqul Mudarressin (also transliterated as Wafaq ul Madaris) of Bangladesh Qawmi Madrasah Education Board, based in Dhaka, including seven smaller private Madrasah education boards. It is an extension of the process that formed the Wafaq ul Madaris Al-Arabia, Pakistan in 1957.

The board was founded to assure a standardized curriculum and to provide a centralized examination. Membership with the board is voluntary, though required for degree accreditation by the Befaqul Mudarressin.

It is organized under a three-tiered representative system led an executive body. The second tier committee comprises senior madrasahs, followed a third tier of ordinary member schools.

Statistics
As of 2008, the board oversees almost 9000 madrasahs at the following levels:

Qawmi schools
The following are some of the notable Qawmi madrasahs in Bangladesh:
Islamic Online Madrasah(IOM)— is the largest online madrasah in the Asia
Al-Jamiatul Arabia Kachemul Uloom Kazirhat Hifz Madrasah and Orphanage - also known as "Kazirhat Madrasah"
 Al-Jamiatul Ahlia Darul Ulum Moinul Islam — also known as "Hathazari Madrasah"
 Jamia Islamia Yunusia, Brahmanbaria 
 Jamia sharyah seirajul ulum and nur shishosadan, Brahmanbaria
 Jamia Madania Angura Muhammedpur (Jamia Angura), Beanibazar, Sylhet - Also known as Banglar Deobond. 
 Jamia Tawakkulia Renga Madrasah in Sylhet
 Jamiatul Uloom Al-Islamia Lalkhan Bazar — also known as "Lalkhan Bazar Madrasah"
 Jamia Qurania Arabia Lalbagh
 Al-Jamiah Al-Islamiah Patiya
 Al-Jamiatul Arabia Lil Banina Wal Banat — also known as "Haildhar Madrasah" is the first women Qawmi Madrasah.

See also
 Bangladesh Qawmi Madrasa Education Commission
 List of Qawmi Madrasas in Bangladesh
 Education in Bangladesh
 Islam in Bangladesh
 Religious education
 Charity school
 List of Islamic seminaries

Footnotes

 Bano (2008) seems to somewhat misquote Ahmed (2005), which is cited just before this note.
 While two sources cited say there are about 4000 Qawmi madrasas, my editorial judgement based upon research is that the 4000 school figure is far too conservative; moreover, the 15,000 madrasah figure is 4 years newer.

References

External links
 List of Darul Ulooms, Jamiyas and Qawmy Madrasas Worldwide compiled by Yousuf Sultan

 
Deobandi Islamic universities and colleges
School types
Islamic terminology
Islamic education